East Farleigh is a village and civil parish in the local government district of Maidstone, Kent, England. The village is located on the south side of the River Medway about two miles (3.2 km) upstream from the town of Maidstone.

Heritage
The Grade I listed East Farleigh Bridge crossing the river here was built in the 14th century and is considered one of the oldest in Kent. It is too narrow to suit modern traffic conditions. It provided the crossing point for the Parliamentary forces in the Battle of Maidstone during the Civil War.

The population of the village expanded from 642 people in 1801 to 1,668 in 1881. The population growth occurred in parallel with an increase in hop production, which the tithe map of 1841 show covering a quarter of all land in the parish, 40 years before peak production was reached. Hops are no longer grown in the parish. The last oast house in the village ceased working in 1977.

East Farleigh appears in the Domesday Book as Ferlaga from the Saxon words referring to a passage (over the river in this case). The nearby village of West Farleigh has the same roots. The 12th-century church is dedicated to St Mary and is a listed building. East Farleigh House was the home of the noted artist Donald Maxwell from 1930 to 1936, and he is buried in the churchyard.

Amenities
There are four public houses in the parish: The Bull in the centre of the village; and The Horseshoes, The Victoria and the Walnut Tree.

East Farleigh railway station (actually in the parish of Barming) is on the Medway Valley Line.

Notable residents
Reynold Pympe, politician
Two sons of William Wilberforce, both of whom were vicars of East Farleigh, are buried in St Mary's churchyard. William Wilberforce himself spent some time at The Old Rectory shortly before he died.

References

Villages in Kent
Civil parishes in Kent